Boris Dubrovsky may refer to:

 Boris Dubrovskiy (born 1939), Russian rower
 Boris Dubrovsky (politician) (born 1958), Russian politician and CEO of the Magnitogorsk Iron and Steel Works